Toto Coelo (renamed Total Coelo in the US) was a 1980s British new wave group, founded by producer Barry Blue. The original members were singers Anita Mahadevan, Lacey Bond, Lindsey Danvers, Ros Holness (daughter of television presenter Bob Holness) and Sheen Doran.

Career
Originally formed in 1981, one of the groups’ first recordings was "Videotheque", a Buggles number written and produced by Trevor Horn. The track became a hit for Dollar in 1982, while the Toto Coelo version remains unreleased. Another early track, "World of Automation", is also unreleased.

The group is most known for the 1982 hit single, "I Eat Cannibals", which reached No. 8 in the UK Singles Chart and was a top 5 hit in Australia, South Africa, and Sweden. "I Eat Cannibals" also charted in the US, where it peaked at No. 66 in April 1983. The follow-up single, "Dracula's Tango (Sucker For Your Love)", reached the top 20 in Australia and top 10 in Sweden. The group's only studio album, 1983's Man o' War, was not a commercial success, charting highest in Sweden at No. 46. A third single, "Milk from the Coconut", was released from the album and peaked at No. 4 in South Africa. Following the album, Anita Mahadevan and Sheen Doran left the group.

The band was briefly featured in the unreleased horror film Grizzly II: The Predator, performing "Milk from the Coconut" in a few scenes of the rock concert.

In 1985, the remaining three members released two further singles, "Girls Night Out" and "Gimme Some Lovin'", neither of which charted.

Lacey, Lindsey and Ros performed as the backing singers for the Bruce Foxton Band in 1985. They feature prominently on the 'Live in London' performance filmed at the Camden Palace, which has been released on video (Dubious, 1986) and DVD (SFM, 2012).

The group's name is Latin and means "by the whole extent of the heavens" or "heaven-wide", but is commonly translated as "completely", "entirely" or "utterly". Of the name, Sheen Doran said, "It has a number of meanings, such as 'heart and soul', 'root and branch' and 'totally different'. It seemed to describe what we were. Plus, it's strange-sounding and hard to pronounce, so it sticks in your mind." The group was renamed Total Coelo in the United States to avoid confusion with the American rock group Toto.

Mahadevan later changed her name to Anita Chellamah, and formed Cherry Bombz with several former members of Hanoi Rocks, including Andy McCoy. She is now known as Anita Chellamah-Nurse and works as a television actress and presenter. She appeared as Tania in the 1995 episode of One Foot in the Grave entitled "The Exterminating Angel".

Discography

Studio albums
 Man o' War (1983) – AUS No. 82, SWE No. 46

Compilation albums
 I Eat Cannibals & Other Tasty Trax (1996) (issued on CD in the US on the Razor & Tie record label, containing all of the Man o' War tracks, plus the bonus track "Weird", and 12" vinyl versions of "I Eat Cannibals" and "Milk from the Coconut")

Singles

References

 I Eat Cannibals & Other Tasty Trax liner notes – 1996

External links
 Anita Chellamah-Nurse CV (2008)
 

English dance music groups
English pop girl groups
English girl groups
British new wave girl groups
English new wave musical groups
Chrysalis Records artists
Virgin Records artists